P. King Duckling is an animated children's television series co-created by Josh Selig, Chen Gu, and Bo Fan. The series debuted its first season on Disney Junior in the United States on November 7, 2016 and ended it on May 11, 2017. It is one of the only Disney series that is not accessible on DisneyNOW. The second season premiered on June 12, 2021 on Disney Channel.

On May 22, 2017, UYoung ordered a second season of P. King Duckling.

Premise
P. King Duckling is about the title character, a young duck, who has adventures in the town of Hilly Hole with his two best friends, Chumpkins and Wombat.

Characters

Main
 P. King (voiced by Marc Thompson): A silly duck who loves to hop around and play with Wombat and Chumpkins. He’s always happy. 
 Wombat (voiced by Courtney Shaw): one of P King’s sidekicks. Her talent is art. She is also very smart. 
 Chumpkins (voiced by Benjie Randall): another one of P King’s sidekicks. He’s a techy pig with a big computer.

Recurring
 Hippo is the new member of Wombat and the Hilly Boyz.
 Greg the Goose is the main antagonist.

Episodes 
Season 1 (2016–17)

Season 2 (2021)

Broadcast
Disney Junior has picked up P. King Duckling to air on its American, Latin American, Indian, Korean, and Southeast Asian channels. In Sweden, the show aired on SVT in Swedish, and in China, the show aired on CCTV-14 Kids Channel in Chinese, both following the show's sale to Disney Junior in the United States. The show is also available on Netflix until May 6, 2021.

References

External links

2010s American animated television series
2016 American television series debuts
2021 American television series endings
2016 Chinese television series debuts
2021 Chinese television series endings
American children's animated adventure television series
American children's animated comedy television series
American flash animated television series
Chinese children's animated adventure television series
Chinese children's animated comedy television series
English-language television shows
Animated television series about children
Animated television series about ducks
Animated television series about pigs
American preschool education television series
Animated preschool education television series
2010s preschool education television series
Disney Junior original programming